Johan Sigismund von Mösting (2 November 1759 – 16 September 1843) was a Danish banker and finance minister. He was a key figure in the foundation of Bank of Denmark in 1818. His name is today also associated with Møstings Hus ("Møsting's House"), his former summer residence in Frederiksberg, Copenhagen, which is now used as an exhibition space.

Early life and education
Johan Sigismund von Mösting was born at Nygård on the island of Møn. His father was Frederik Christian von Møsting who was governor of the island. Johan Sigismund von Mösting studied  jurisprudence at University of Copenhagen, graduating in 1782.

Career
1813 became director of the Danish Reichsbank. He subsequently served as Denmark's minister of finance until 1831, president of the Chamber of Finance and Prime Minister of the Danish Kings. In 1838 he served as Director of the King's library.

Cape Møsting in Greenland was named after him in 1829 by Lieutenant Wilhelm August Graah (1793–1863).

Astronomy
He helped promote interest in astronomy and was a significant figure in the founding of the scientific journal Astronomische Nachrichten. The Mösting crater on the Moon is named after him.

See also
 Swedish Embassy, Copenhagen, where Møsting lived from 1814 to 1818

References

Government ministers of Denmark
Danish bankers
People from Møn
1759 births
1843 deaths